The International Journal of Insect Science was a peer-reviewed open-access scientific journal published by SAGE Publishing, and is no longer accepting submissions. The journal covers fundamental, experimental, and applied research.

Abstracting and indexing 
This journal is indexed by the following services:

Chemical Abstracts Service
The Zoological Record

References

External links 

Biology journals
Open access journals
English-language journals
Publications established in 2009